Stefania Bucci (born 4 June 1960) is an Italian gymnast. She competed in six events at the 1976 Summer Olympics.

References

1960 births
Living people
Italian female artistic gymnasts
Olympic gymnasts of Italy
Gymnasts at the 1976 Summer Olympics
Sportspeople from Arezzo